Krish J. Sathaar (born Unnikrishnan Sathaar; 1 January 1984) is an Indian actor and entrepreneur who primarily works in Malayalam films.

Career
Krish was born to actors Sathaar and Jayabharathi on 1 January 1984. He has studied engineering and pursued a master's degree in management as well. Krish was working in America after he completed his studies in England.

Being born into a film family, he received several acting offers. He chose the Mohanlal starrer Ladies and Gentleman directed by the very successful film maker Siddique as his launchpad. He was pursuing a course at the New York Film Academy before entering the film industry. In 2014, he made his Tamil film debut in Malini 22 Palayamkottai directed by Sripriya, the Tamil remake of Aashiq Abu's, 22 Female Kottayam. His next film was To Noora with Love in which he portrays the lead character Shahjahan, a happy-go-lucky guy and sufi singer. He had agreed to be part of the film Thakkali but later opted out due to date issues.

Entrepreneurial Ventures
Krish owns and operates concept cocktail bars in London. Being an avid cocktail enthusiast he took it up as a hobby and later trained and honed his skills in cocktails during his time in New York.

He developed the concept and brand and opened his first location in London. The first location was voted in the top ten best cocktail bars in the United Kingdom. Recently he opened his second bar concept, also in London.

Filmography

Awards and nominations
Awards (for Ladies and Gentleman)
 2013 - Asiavision Awards - Best Debut Actor
2014 - Jaycee Foundation Awards - Best Debut Actor
2014 - SIIMA Awards - Best Debut Actor

Nominations  (for To Noora with Love)
Asiavision Awards - Best Actor - Nominated
SIIMA awards - Best Actor - Nominated
Asianet Film Awards - Best Actor - Nominated

References

External links 

 

Living people
1984 births
Male actors in Malayalam cinema
Indian male film actors
Male actors from Kerala
21st-century Indian male actors
People from Ernakulam district
South Indian International Movie Awards winners